

292001–292100 

|-id=051
| 292051 Bohlender ||  || David Bohlender (born 1959) a Canadian astrophysicist and member of the IAU, who uses high-resolution spectroscopy to research magnetars and chemically peculiar stars (such as Bp stars), emission-line stars, exoplanets, and the interstellar medium  (Src, IAU) || 
|}

292101–292200 

|-id=159
| 292159 Jongoldstein ||  || Jon Goldstein (born 1981), an American research engineer and PhD student at George Mason University and BAE Systems, who is focused in computer simulations of social systems || 
|-id=160
| 292160 Davefask ||  || David Fask (born 1982), an American psychologist from the University of Virginia whose research is focused on substance dependence and abuse. His PhD thesis explored the cognitive development of twins. || 
|}

292201–292300 

|-bgcolor=#f2f2f2
| colspan=4 align=center | 
|}

292301–292400 

|-bgcolor=#f2f2f2
| colspan=4 align=center | 
|}

292401–292500 

|-id=459
| 292459 Antoniolasciac ||  || Antonio Lasciac (1856–1946), an Italian–Slovene architect, engineer, poet and musician, who designed the Khedive Palace in Istanbul and the Tahra Palace in Cairo || 
|}

292501–292600 

|-bgcolor=#f2f2f2
| colspan=4 align=center | 
|}

292601–292700 

|-bgcolor=#f2f2f2
| colspan=4 align=center | 
|}

292701–292800 

|-bgcolor=#f2f2f2
| colspan=4 align=center | 
|}

292801–292900 

|-id=872
| 292872 Anoushankar ||  || Anoushka Shankar (born 1981), an Indian sitar musician and composer || 
|}

292901–293000 

|-id=991
| 292991 Lyonne ||  || Laurence Lyonne (born 1969) and Jean-Claude Lyonne (born 1965), both active and enthusiastic leaders of the French astronomy club "Le Curieux du Ciel" at Gueugnon, Burgundy, which they founded in 1999 || 
|}

References 

292001-293000